Locone Lake is a lake in the Province of Barletta-Andria-Trani, Apulia, Italy.

See also
Locone
Loconia

Lakes of Apulia
Province of Barletta-Andria-Trani